Wingspan is a 2001 made-for-television documentary film about Paul McCartney's musical career, after The Beatles disbanded, with his second band, Wings.

Produced by the McCartneys' MPL Communications, it was broadcast around the world to accompany the contemporary release of a two-disc retrospective collection from McCartney's solo career, titled Wingspan: Hits and History.
An accompanying book, also titled Wingspan, based upon the documentary's script as edited by Beatles' historian Mark Lewisohn, was published in 2002.

Summary
Formed around an interview between Paul McCartney and his daughter Mary McCartney (who co-produced it with her then-husband Alistair Donald, its director), it uses the McCartneys' film and photographic archive to tell the story of Paul and Linda's founding of the band Wings in the aftermath of The Beatles' split and of its gradual evolution during the 1970s, through several line-ups. From an initial atmosphere of critical disdain and personal derision for both McCartneys the film charts the band's progress to its commercial peaks of international success and acclaim before it suffers its own disintegration at the beginning of the 1980s.

The story takes up with the late-1960s meeting of Paul McCartney and photographer Linda Eastman against the background of the gradual disintegration of relationships in The Beatles. As the pair get married and withdraw from the situation of McCartney's public resignation from and legal action against The Beatles partnership, the story moves to his depressed retreat from public life in the aftermath of The Beatles' split, his initial solo albums and his gradual return to recording and playing live with a new band, Wings, formed by the pair with drummer Denny Seiwell and guitarists Denny Laine and Henry McCullough.

The initial line-up's tentative tours and releases are detailed before the sudden departure of Seiwell and McCullough leads to Wings' first big commercial breakthrough, the 1973 album Band on the Run.
The rebuilding of the band line-up, bringing in guitarist Jimmy McCulloch and drummer Geoff Britton, soon replaced by Joe English, proceeds against Wings' continued commercial ascent, culminating in their 1976 world tour which brings success which begins to rival that of The Beatles. This continues, even after the line-up is once again reduced to the trio of the McCartneys and Laine, who release a single, "Mull of Kintyre" / "Girls' School", in 1977, which tops the UK's best-selling singles of all time, previously headed by The Beatles' "She Loves You".
Although a further five-piece line-up evolves and Wings continue to tour (with guitarist Laurence Juber and drummer Steve Holley), it is against McCartney's feeling that he has proved beyond doubt that there is life for him after The Beatles.
The story's climax comes with McCartney's arrest and imprisonment in Japan in 1980 on drugs charges, at the start of Wings' tour there, leading to the end of the band.

Commercial release on VHS and DVD
Expanded versions of the film, re-entitled Wingspan - An Intimate Portrait were also released commercially on VHS and DVD in 2001, the latter featuring an additional 22 minutes of interview footage and a number of promotional videos.

See also
 The Beatles Anthology, a multimedia retrospect project by the three surviving members of the Beatles that follows a very similar format.

References

External links

2001 films
Paul McCartney
2001 documentary films
2000s English-language films